Joseph W. Bruno (born July 6, 1955) is an American academic and former university administrator. He became the 18th president of Marietta College on July 1, 2012. Dr. Bruno took over for Dr. Jean A. Scott, who retired after 12 years. Formerly, he was the Vice President for Academic Affairs at Wesleyan University (2006–2010), Dean of Natural Sciences and Mathematics at Wesleyan (2003–06) and worked at Wesleyan since 1984, beginning as a chemistry professor

Bruno was inaugurated on Oct. 12, 2012. Bruno, along with his wife, Diane, have instituted a few new programs — most notably Cooking 301 and Brunos' Choice Awards — on campus to help connect the student body with the President and first lady. 

Bruno graduated from Augustana College in 1978 with a Bachelor of Arts in Chemistry. He earned a Ph.D. in Organometallic Chemistry from Northwestern University in 1983.

On November 10, 2015 President Bruno announced that he would be leaving Marietta College at the end of the academic year in May 2016 to "pursue new professional challenges". His final day was May 13, 2016.

References

 

Living people
1955 births
Augustana College (Illinois) alumni
Northwestern University alumni
Marietta College people
Wesleyan University faculty
Heads of universities and colleges in the United States